The 2021 AFL Grand Final was an Australian rules football match contested between  and the  at Optus Stadium in Perth, Western Australia, on Saturday 25 September 2021. It was the 126th annual grand final of the Australian Football League (AFL), staged to determine the premiers of the 2021 AFL season. As the top-placed side on the ladder at the end of the 2021 home-and-away season, Melbourne finished minor premiers, whereas the Western Bulldogs faded in the final four home-and-away games to finish 5th, thus needing to win all of their finals games to qualify for the grand final.

The match was played at Optus Stadium in Perth because an ongoing COVID-19 lockdown prevented the match from being played with spectators at its contracted ground, the Melbourne Cricket Ground in Melbourne, Victoria. It was the first grand final played in Perth and the second consecutive grand final to be played outside Victoria. The event set a new attendance record for Australian rules football in Western Australia, eclipsing the previous record set in 2018 despite not featuring any WA-based teams and being played during the COVID pandemic.

Melbourne won the match by a 74-point margin, defeating the Western Bulldogs 21.14 (140) to 10.6 (66). Christian Petracca won the Norm Smith Medal. The win was Melbourne's first premiership since 1964.

Background

Host selection process 

For the second consecutive season, the COVID-19 pandemic caused alterations to the grand final scheduling. As the 2021 AFL finals series approached, the state of Victoria was under lockdown restrictions that made mass gatherings at stadiums impossible; the Victorian lockdown had commenced on 6 August, and case numbers continued to rise through August, resulting in repeated extensions of the lockdown. Although the league had been playing matches behind closed doors in Victoria right up to the end of the home-and-away season, it was committed to playing the finals and grand final in front of a crowd. Throughout August, contingency arrangements for the 2021 Grand Final were explored.

On 16 August, the league brought the finals one week forward, dropping the conventional pre-finals bye from the fixture; this provided flexibility for a number of COVID-impacted finals scenarios, and in particular allowed enough time for a mid-finals bye which would allow clubs to serve Western Australia's quarantine requirements without impacting the grand final date.

While the Melbourne Cricket Ground remained the default host of the game if it was possible, the State Governments of Western Australia and South Australia put forward pitches to host the game at Optus Stadium or Adelaide Oval, respectively. The Queensland Government kept the Gabba available, but it made no active pitch to host the game. On 25 August, Optus Stadium was officially announced as the standby venue for the match, in the event that the Melbourne Cricket Ground was not capable of hosting a crowd larger than Optus Stadium's 60,000-seat capacity. The reasoning given for the selection of Optus Stadium over Adelaide Oval was the restricted capacity of the latter with the South Australian Government only permitting 30,000 spectators for the match. On 31 August, shortly after Victoria's lockdown was extended into October, the switch of the venue to Optus Stadium was officially confirmed; the originally fixtured date of 25 September was confirmed, with the mid-finals bye week scheduled for the week between the preliminary finals and grand final. No back-up venue to Optus Stadium was announced, with the league intending to play the match one week later in Perth should local COVID-19 cases have resulted in a lockdown during grand final week.

The change of venue required the permission of the Victorian Government and Melbourne Cricket Club, which was contracted to host the grand final until 2058; this was obtained, in exchange for the long-term contract at the Melbourne Cricket Ground being extended by one year to 2059, eight additional home-and-away matches scheduled for the ground between 2022 and 2026, four additional AFLW matches per season scheduled for regional Victoria between 2022 and 2024, and Victoria to host the 2022 and 2023 AFL drafts.

Other impacts
The start time for the game was 5:15 pm AWST / 7:15 pm AEST, making it the first grand final played in the twilight timeslot and second consecutive grand final in the east-coast night timeslot. The league opted for this over the traditional and originally scheduled start time of 2:30 pm AEST because this would have resulted in an impractically early local start time of 12:30 pm AWST.

At the time of the announcement, Western Australia had no spectator restrictions on major events at outdoor stadiums, as well as the strictest entry quarantine restrictions on interstate travellers. The Western Australian Government's border restrictions allowed only for those essential to the staging of the game to travel into the state, meaning guests of the clubs and league who would usually attend—such as the families of players and coaches, non-critical media or administrators, etc.—were absent. The Norm Smith Medal and Jock McHale Medal were presented by 2006 winners Andrew Embley and John Worsfold, respectively; under the convention that the medal be awarded by prior winners in chronological order, Nathan Buckley or Chris Judd would have been next in line to present the Norm Smith Medal, and Paul Roos to present the Jock McHale Medal, but they, too, were denied entry. Two Victoria-based Melbourne fans, Mark Babbage and Hayden Burbank, were convicted and spent three months in prison for illegally travelling from Melbourne to Perth via Darwin for the match.

The AFL elected not to host a full-scale grand final parade featuring the competing teams, citing threats from COVID-19, staffing availability, and terrorism, despite the state government and the Western Australian Police Force considering it safe to hold the event. The city put on a smaller-scale "people's parade" in Forrest Place on the Friday before the game, celebrating the game but not featuring the clubs.

Qualification 

Melbourne finished the home-and-away season as minor premiers with a 17–4–1 record, its best finish since 1964. The club then recorded comfortable victories in both of its finals—by 33 points against  in the qualifying final and by 83 points against  in the preliminary final—to qualify. It was Melbourne's first grand final appearance since 2000, and the club was attempting to win its first premiership since 1964 and break a 57-year premiership drought, the longest active drought in the league and fourth-longest drought in league history.

The Western Bulldogs, for their part, spent much of their season in a battle with Melbourne for the minor premiership; however, after losing its last three home-and-away games, the Bulldogs slipped to fifth place on the ladder, with a record of 15–7. It was the Bulldogs' first grand final berth since its victory in the 2016 decider.

The match was the second grand final between the two clubs; they had previously contested the 1954 VFL Grand Final, which was won by the Western Bulldogs (who were at the time known as Footscray). After the conclusion of both preliminary finals, Melbourne were backed as favourites, with bookmakers paying out $1.67 for a Melbourne victory; it was the first time Melbourne had entered the grand final as the favourites since 1964.

The two sides faced each other twice during 2021: Melbourne winning by 28 points at Marvel Stadium in Round 11, and the Bulldogs winning by 20 points at the Melbourne Cricket Ground in Round 19. Due to COVID-19 lockdowns in Victoria being in place at the time on both occasions, both of these matches were played behind closed doors.

Teams

The Western Bulldogs made two changes to its starting 22 from the preliminary final: Cody Weightman and Alex Keath returned from injury, while Laitham Vandermeer and Ryan Gardner were omitted. Melbourne's starting 22 was unchanged. The teams' medical substitutes were not announced until immediately prior to the match. James Jordon was the medical sub for Melbourne, and Vandermeer (despite being omitted from the main 22) was selected as the Bulldogs' medical sub. The medical sub of the winning team (Jordon) was awarded a premiership medallion despite not being activated.

Both clubs wore their regular home guernseys, with the  wearing white shorts as the lower-seeded club.

Umpires
The umpiring panel—comprising three field umpires, four boundary umpires, two goal umpires, and an emergency in each position—is given below.

Numbers in brackets represent the number of grand finals umpired, including 2021.

Entertainment

The entertainment for the 2021 AFL Grand Final was centred around artists from Western Australia due to COVID-19 restrictions. The Welcome to Country was given by Noongar man Richard Walley. Mike Brady performed "Up There Cazaly", a song traditionally sung at AFL grand finals, remotely from Melbourne. The pre-match live entertainment began with a performance of AC/DC's "Thunderstruck" by Abbe May from the roof of the stadium. Baker Boy performed a mashup of Kylie Minogue's "Spinning Around" and Baker Boy's "Meditjin", including a didgeridoo solo in the middle. John Butler performed Icehouse's iconic 1982 hit "Great Southern Land", joined in by Stella Donnelly, Donna Simpson and Vikki Thorn of The Waifs, Gina Williams, and Guy Ghouse. Eskimo Joe performed "Black Fingernails, Red Wine" and INXS's "Kick", featuring saxophonist Erin Royer. Colin Hay from Men At Work performed "Land Down Under" from a beach in Los Angeles, joined in by the rest of the performers live at the stadium. Soprano Amy Manford performed Australia's national anthem, "Advance Australia Fair".

At half-time, Birds of Tokyo and the West Australian Symphony Orchestra performed "Lanterns", a cover of Silverchair's "Straight Lines", and "Unbreakable".

Match summary
There were no late changes for either team.

First quarter 

After a few early misses by Melbourne early in the first quarter, the first goal was scored by Melbourne's Christian Petracca from the  arc from about a 40-degree angle. Cody Weightman collided with a goal post after attempting a mark near the goal line. A fumble by the Bulldogs' Bailey Williams in Melbourne's forward half allowed Charlie Spargo to pick up the ball and score a goal – Melbourne's third overall. Williams would then drop a mark and give another goal to Bayley Fritsch two minutes later. The quarter ended with Melbourne 21 points ahead, having scored four goals to the Western Bulldogs' one.

Second quarter 
The momentum of the game shifted to the Bulldogs in the second quarter. Adam Treloar started off by kicking back-to-back goals. Just after that, Aaron Naughton kicked the Bulldog's third goal in four minutes. Melbourne's Max Gawn scored what he initially thought to be a goal, but the goal umpire deemed it a behind as it had passed over the goal post. Ultimately, the Bulldogs scored six goals to one in the second quarter to take an eight-point lead at the main change, including two goals from Marcus Bontempelli.

Third quarter 
The Bulldogs continued their good streak through the first half of the third quarter. Jason Johannisen took an impressive mark next to the goal posts, resulting in a goal to extend the lead for the Bulldogs.  Bontempelli slotted his third goal with a snap shot from 35 metres out to extend their lead to 19 points and firming up his Norm Smith Medal chances in the process. However, the momentum shifted again, this time towards the Demons. Fritsch kicked back-to-back goals, and Ben Brown kicked another, bringing them within one point. Melbourne players Angus Brayshaw, Petracca, Tom Sparrow and Clayton Oliver each scored goals, giving Melbourne a four-goal lead at three quarter time.

Final quarter 
Melbourne ran away with the win, kicking nine goals in the final quarter compared to the Bulldogs' one. Fritsch added multiple goals to bring his tally to six; it was the first time a player had scored six goals or more in a grand final since Adelaide's Darren Jarman's six-goal performance in 1997. Adam Treloar kicked the only Bulldogs goal for the quarter. Tom McDonald kicked a goal after the siren to bring the margin to 74 points, the largest-ever grand final win for Melbourne.

Post-match 
The victory was Melbourne's first VFL/AFL premiership in 57 years, ending the longest active premiership drought of any team in the competition. The television broadcast showed reactions from many interstate Melbourne supporters who were precluded from attending the match due to COVID-19 restrictions, including former Melbourne Coach Neale Daniher, who was seen draping his scarf over a TV in celebration of Melbourne's long-awaited premiership. The Bulldogs statistically led Melbourne with the total number of kicks (207–206), handballs (172–160), and marks (76–68), but the Demons had six more free kicks (19–13); however, the Demons had 15 more inside-50s (64–49), including 13 more marks inside 50 (17–4), and 11 more clearances (44–33). The premiership cup was awarded by Melbourne Hall of Fame member and Melbourne Team of the Century member Garry Lyon. Master of ceremonies Basil Zempilas received criticism for failing to allow Melbourne premiership coach Simon Goodwin to speak after the win.

Due to Optus Stadium's extensive corporate facilities, the AFL generated A$40 million from hosting the AFL Grand Final in Perth.

Norm Smith Medal 

With a record-equalling grand final possession tally of 39 (shared with Simon Black in 2003)—and despite six goals from Fritsch—Petracca secured the medal after unanimously being judged best afield by an expert panel chaired by Luke Hodge. The possession tally was initially reported as 40, which would have broken the grand final record, but this was revised after the match to 39. Andrew Embley awarded the medal to Petracca; somewhat controversially, however, Zempilas announced the Norm Smith Medal winner before Embley had the chance, receiving further criticism. The votes were as follows:

Scoreboard

Media coverage 
Per the AFL TV rights, the Seven Network had the exclusive broadcast rights within Australia, with Fox Footy showing the replay of the match after the game despite broadcasting its own pre-game, half-time and post-game coverage.

Once streaming services were factored in, the match had an average national viewership of 4.11 million, eclipsing the 2016 AFL Grand Final by just 21,000 and about 200,000 more than the 2020 AFL Grand Final. It is the fourth most-watched VFL/AFL game in history, and it was the most-watched Grand Final since 2005, which averaged a national audience of 4.449 million.

Due to quarantine requirements for Victorian residents to enter Western Australia, Seven Network commentators James Brayshaw, Brian Taylor and Daisy Pearce, and Fox Footy's Garry Lyon and Kath Loughnan, all quarantined for two weeks in the lead-up to the match. For Taylor, this was his fifth AFL Grand Final he called on commercial television, while for Brayshaw, it was his first, having been promoted to Seven's Friday night AFL commentary team at the beginning of the season when Bruce McAvaney scaled back his duties with the network.

Radio coverage

See also
1954 VFL Grand Final
2021 AFL Women's Grand Final
2021 AFL Season

References

External links

2021 AFL Grand Final at Australian Football

2021 Australian Football League season
AFL Grand Final 2021
VFL/AFL Grand Finals
AFL Grand Final
AFL Grand Final
2020s in Perth, Western Australia